Steven John Crane (born 3 June 1972) is an English former professional footballer.

Crane started his professional career with Charlton Athletic in July 1990 as a trainee. In November 1990 he played for Margate on loan, but was recalled by Charlton only a month later. He did not qualify as a member of the Charlton first team and left them in February 1991 without having played in any game. He finally made his first professional appearances on the field when he rejoined Margate in 1991, playing with them for two pre-season games. He left shortly thereafter when he garnered a football scholarship to Tusculum College in the United States, where he studied foreign languages. While at Tusculum he had an impressive playing career, scoring 99 goals in just two seasons. He returned to the UK in December 1992 to join Aveley.

References

External links

1972 births
Living people
People from Grays, Essex
Sportspeople from Essex
Association football forwards
English footballers
Charlton Athletic F.C. players
Margate F.C. players
Aveley F.C. players
Gillingham F.C. players
Hornchurch F.C. players
Chelmsford City F.C. players
Tilbury F.C. players
East Thurrock United F.C. players
Papatoetoe AFC players
Torquay United F.C. players
Hastings United F.C. players
Billericay Town F.C. players
Great Wakering Rovers F.C. players
English Football League players
Tusculum University alumni